Virtuous is a 2014 American Christian drama film directed and produced by Bill Rahn, written by Jason Campbell & Tara Lynn Marcelle, and starring Erik Estrada, Erin Bethea, Ben Davies, and Jessica Lynch. Based upon an original story by Jason Campbell, it was produced by Christian film company JCFILMS.

Synopsis
Women of all ages and races are experiencing pressures from an increasingly unavoidable culture. If they attempt to stand up for themselves, they are criticized, marginalized, and demonized.  As a film, Virtuous is a modern-day version of Proverbs 31, set as a multi-plot project, with stories including that of a Hollywood starlet, a soldier on the battlefield, a successful businesswoman, and the housekeeping and cooking skills of an old mom. The film involves 10 women who eventually meet and attempt to show what it means to be a “virtuous” woman in today’s society. The film focuses on empowering women to live righteously while remaining unapologetic in their actions or beliefs.

Principal cast

 Erik Estrada as Jack Evans
 Erin Bethea as Diane Landers
 Ben Davies as Patrick Walters
 Jessica Lynch as Summer Gabriel
 Kelly Bowling as Kathy Morris

Production
Jessica Lynch was brought aboard the film in a role of a military specialist arranging to locate a female POW after speaking with story creator Jason Campbell. Her role was loosely based on her own experiences in Iraq.  Some of the filming took place in areas of Butts County, Georgia over a one-month period in January 2014.  Locations included local homes and offices, as well as the Butts County Courthouse and Butts County Sheriff’s Office. Other Georgia locations included Juliette, Griffin, Macon and the Rock Springs Church in Milner.  In February 2014, JC Films announced that Erik Estrada would film some of his final scenes for Virtuous in Rock Hill, South Carolina in early September, 2014.  Five songs from Christian singer/songwriter Holly Spears are featured in the film, and released May 1, 2014, Spears' music video Where'd You Go contains clips from the film.

Reception

References

External links
 
 
 

2014 films
American independent films
2014 drama films
2010s English-language films
2000s English-language films
2010s American films
American drama films